Warszawa Młynów railway station is a railway station in the Wola district of Warsaw, Poland. It was built on the Warsaw orbital line, which goes through Warszawa Gdańska station. In 2011, it was used exclusively by Koleje Mazowieckie which run the KM9 services from Warszawa Wola through the north of the Masovian Voivodeship to Działdowo, in the Warmian-Masurian Voivodeship, via Legionowo, Nasielsk, Modlin, Ciechanów and Mława, at all of which some trains terminate.

The station was originally opened in 1988, named Warszawa Koło for the Koło neighborhood of the Wola district. It was closed in March 2017 for the reconstruction of the Warszawa Zachodnia−Warszawa Gdańska railway line. Upon reopening in October 2018, its name was changed to Warszawa Młynów, mirroring the nearby Młynów metro station in Młynów opened in April 2020. The name Warszawa Koło is used for a new station located further to the north.

References
Station article at kolej.one.pl

External links 
 

Młynów
Railway stations served by Koleje Mazowieckie
Wola